McSherry is a surname, and may refer to:

 David McSherry
 James McSherry (Maryland judge) (1842–1907), American jurist
 James McSherry (Pennsylvania politician) (1776–1849), American politician
 John McSherry (1944–1996), American umpire in Major League 
 John McSherry (musician)
 J. Patrice McSherry, professor of political science at Long Island University
 Paul McSherry, guitarist from Northern Ireland
 Richard McSherry (1817–1885), American physician
 Clayton McSherry (Psychologist)
William McSherry (1799–1839), American Jesuit and president of Georgetown University
 Frank McSherry, American computer scientist

See also 
 

Anglicised Irish-language surnames